In enzymology, a 15-oxoprostaglandin 13-oxidase is an enzyme that catalyzes the chemical reaction

(5Z)-(15S)-11alpha-hydroxy-9,15-dioxoprostanoate + NAD(P)+  (5Z)-(15S)-11alpha-hydroxy-9,15-dioxoprosta-13-enoate + NAD(P)H + H+

The 3 substrates of this enzyme are (5Z)-(15S)-11alpha-hydroxy-9,15-dioxoprostanoate, NAD+, and NADP+, whereas its 4 products are (5Z)-(15S)-11alpha-hydroxy-9,15-dioxoprosta-13-enoate, NADH, NADPH, and H+.

This enzyme belongs to the family of oxidoreductases, specifically those acting on the CH-CH group of donor with NAD+ or NADP+ as acceptor.  The systematic name of this enzyme class is (5Z)-(15S)-11alpha-hydroxy-9,15-dioxoprostanoate:NAD(P)+ Delta13-oxidoreductase. Other names in common use include 15-oxo-Delta13-prostaglandin reductase, Delta13-15-ketoprostaglandin reductase, 15-ketoprostaglandin Delta13-reductase, prostaglandin Delta13-reductase, prostaglandin 13-reductase, and 15-ketoprostaglandin Delta13-reductase.

Structural studies

References 

 
 

EC 1.3.1
NADPH-dependent enzymes
NADH-dependent enzymes
Enzymes of known structure